The Liberator Village was the government housing area for employees of the Consolidated Aircraft Corporation aircraft manufacturing plant which was constructed after 18 April 1942 next to the Army Air Force (AAF) Base Tarrant Field Airdrome, and an AAF aircraft plant NO. 4 was built just west of Fort Worth, Texas along the south side of Lake Worth. The Consolidated Vultee Bomber Plant workers would build the B-24 "Liberator" heavy bomber. Later, they would build the B-32 Dominator bomber that made it to the war for only a short time. The plant begun production less than a year later while much of its workforce was accommodated in the 1500 prefabricated dwelling units located around the south gate of the bomber plant which housed men and women that built the B-24 bomber near Fort Worth, Texas during World War II.

The war had caused a shortage of housing in the area, therefore, the government decided to build a complex within walking distance to the plant. It would be named Liberator Village after the name of the B-24 bomber.

The employees worked in difficult living conditions with the housing described as "ricky-ticky houses and open sewers". However, this is disputed by Lambert. The village was built in three parts.  The first was the part just across the road from the plant.  It was built in the shape of barracks buildings.  The next two parts were built about a mile away and were the built as "brick" buildings and small housing units with asbestos siding.  One is still in existence and being used as a newspaper office.

The village was operated by the Federal Public Housing Authority, later to be called the Fort Worth Housing Authority, which was directed by Mr. Lealand Hunter. The tenants called it the Village Housing Authority (VHA). The VHA director was Mr. P. F. Miller. The building site was in the White Settlement area just south of the aircraft plant. The apartments were constructed in four stages at a cost of three and a half million dollars giving six thousand people from all over the United States a place to live near the new plant.

Many families that moved into these units had never had indoor plumbing, water, or electricity. All bills were paid for only $35.00 to $40.00 rent per month.

The Village caused a large problem for the small school district that had only one building with four classrooms. Soon, with government aid, several more buildings were added to the school. Even with the new buildings the students still had to go to class in shifts. A large strip mall was built nearby with a drug, grocery, clothing stores, post office and other small shops.

In May 1949 the Village was inundated  by a flood, but largely escaped damage with a small area north of the Village washed out by Farmers Creek. A few trailer houses were damaged, and one boy was killed. The Village became a part of the White Settlement in 1954 and finally closed in 1955. It is now a suburb of Fort Worth famous for its longest factory building in the World operated by Lockheed Martin, and its proximity to the Fort Worth Naval Air Station.

The plant would continue to build the even larger B-36 bomber, but the Village would fade away during the mid-1950s. The aircraft plant, its workers and the village are commemorated by the White Settlement Historical Museum.

References

Sources
 Maurice G. Lambert, Memories of Liberator Village, Memorabiliacs Press, 2006
 Robert Harris Talbert, Cowtown-metropolis: Case Study of a City's Growth and Structure, Fort Worth (Tex.), Leo Potishman Foundation, Texas Christian University, 1956 
 Bill Yenne, William Yenne, The American Aircraft Factory in World War II, Zenith Imprint, 2006 
 Jerry Flemmons, Amon: The Texan who Played Cowboy for America, Texas Tech University Press, 1998
 Oliver Knight, Cissy Stewart Lale, Fort Worth: Outpost on the Trinity, TCU Press, 1990 
 Harold A. Skaarup, Texas Warbird Survivors 2003: A Handbook on Where to Find Them, iUniverse, 2002 

United States home front during World War II
History of Fort Worth, Texas